"(Opportunity Knocks But Once) Snatch and Grab It" is a 1947 novelty song composed by Sharon A. Pease.  The song was performed by Julia Lee and Her Boy Friends.  The single was number one on the US Billboard R&B chart for twelve weeks and spent seven months on the chart.

References

1947 songs
Novelty songs
Hokum blues songs